"Inside My Love" is a 1975 single by Minnie Riperton from her album Adventures in Paradise. It was co-written by Riperton, Leon Ware and Richard Rudolph.

Critical reception

BBC Music wrote "Of Ware’s tracks, the standout is Inside My Love, where ambiguous yet explicit sexual imagery is tempered by the innocence of Riperton’s vocal."

In a positive review Andy Kellman wrote "Each of the Riperton/Rudolph/Ware songs ooze playful sensuality, desire, and lust -- especially "Inside My Love" (a Top 30 R&B single), a swooning slow jam filled with double entendres."

Delilah version

British musician Delilah released a cover version of "Inside My Love" on July 13, 2012, as a digital download in the United Kingdom as the fourth single from her debut album, From the Roots Up. The song peaked at number 60 on the UK Singles Chart.

Music video
A music video to accompany the release of "Inside My Love" was first released onto YouTube on June 19, 2012 at a total length of four minutes and twenty-three seconds.

Track listing

Chart performance

Release history

References

External links
 Discogs.com

1975 songs
1975 singles
2012 singles
Minnie Riperton songs
Delilah (musician) songs
Songs written by Leon Ware
Songs written by Richard Rudolph
Songs written by Minnie Riperton
1970s ballads